Avatar: The Last Airbender is an American animated television series created by Michael Dante DiMartino and Bryan Konietzko. It first aired on February 21, 2005, on Nickelodeon with a one-hour series premiere and concluded its run with a two-hour TV movie on July 19, 2008. The Avatar: The Last Airbender franchise refers to each season as a "Book", in which each episode is referred to as a "chapter". Each "Book" takes its name from one of the elements that Aang, the protagonist, must master: Water, Earth, and Fire. The show's first two seasons each consisted of 20 episodes, while the third season had 21. In addition to the three seasons, there were two recap episodes and three "shorts". The first recap summarized the first seventeen episodes while the second summarized season two. The first self-parody was released via an online flash game. The second and third were released with the Complete Second Season Box Set DVD. The entire series has been released on DVD in Region One, Region Two and Region Four.

In the Avatar: The Last Airbender universe, there are people who are able to manipulate, or "bend", the four elements: Air, Water, Earth, and Fire.There are also sub-elements, such as metal, ice, and lightning. Along with the four elements, there are four nations that correspond with each element. Not everyone can bend an element, and those that can can only bend one. However, the Avatar is a being able to manipulate all four elements as well as communicate with the spirits. The Avatar is also born into one nation, and after dying, is reincarnated into another nation following the pattern of Fire, Air, Water, and Earth. The series takes place 100 years after the Fire Nation declares war against all other nations and has killed off all airbenders in search of finding the Avatar, who has been reincarnated as an airbender named Aang. The Avatar, trapped in ice for 100 years, knows nothing of the war. The series starts with Aang being accidentally freed by Katara, a waterbender. The series then primarily follows the adventures of Aang and his companions, Katara, Sokka, and later Toph, as he tries to master all four elements and defeat the Fire Nation. There is also a strong secondary focus on Zuko, the banished and disinherited crown prince of the Fire Nation. Zuko was scarred in a duel with his own father, the current Fire Lord, and is obsessed with trying to capture Aang to regain his father's favor and in doing so restoring his honor.

Series overview

Episodes

Book One: Water (2005)

Book Two: Earth (2006)

Book Three: Fire (2007–08)

Video releases

Region 1
The first Avatar: The Last Airbender DVD set became available on January 31, 2006. The first season had five DVD sets, each containing four episodes. For season two and three, four DVD sets were released, with five episodes on each. The only exception to the release pattern was the last DVD set of season three, which contained a sixth episode. At the end of each season, a box set was released, containing all of the episodes from the season. Each box set contains an additional disc of bonus features not available as an individual disc release like every episode of the series. Avatar: The Last Airbender: The Complete Series DVD box set featuring all 3 books was released in North America on October 6, 2015. A Blu-ray version of The Complete Series box set was released in the North America on June 5, 2018.

Region 2
In the United States, all Season One DVDs were encoded using NTSC. Since this is not compatible in most countries outside North America, Nickelodeon released separate DVDs in regions where the video would be encoded using PAL instead. These releases began on February 19, 2007; each DVD was released months after the original release. As with the original DVDs, each set contained five episodes on one disc, with the exception of The Complete Book One Collection Box Set, which contained all of the twenty episodes in the season on five discs. In the Netherlands, all episodes came out in a box.

Avatar: The Last Airbender: The Complete Series DVD box set featuring all 3 books was released in the United Kingdom on August 6, 2012. A Blu-ray version of The Complete Series box set was released in the United Kingdom on June 11, 2018.

Region 4
The following release dates are the Australian release dates, and may or may not represent the release dates for all of region 4.

See also 

 List of The Legend of Korra episodes

Footnotes
1, 2, 3. Production code format taken from the commentary for "Sozin's Comet: The Phoenix King"

References
 
 
 
 
 
Specific

Episodes, List Of Avatar: The Last Airbender
Lists of American children's animated television series episodes
Lists of Nickelodeon television series episodes